Święta wojna (eng. Holy War) is a popular Polish comedy series broadcast on TVP2 from January 23, 2000 to May 9, 2009. The series runs in Katowice. In this series characters communicate using a mix of Silesian and Polish language to show culture whilst remaining intelligible for the Polish speaking audience.

A 11th season was premiered in autumn 2020.

Plot 

The plot centers around Hubert Dworniok (a Silesian twist on the Polish surname Dworniak) and his wife Anna. Hubert, more commonly known as Bercik, is a former miner. His wife Anna often refers to him as her 'silesian Tamagotchi', a play on the fact that Bercik exhibits small-man syndrome.

In retirement, the plot follows Bercik's inept and optimistic attempts to get rich, often using his Warsaw friend from their time at the Army, Zbyszek - who always enlists to help Bercik and attempts to keep Bercik out of trouble. Zbyszek often stays over at Bercik's flat when he comes to Katowice to do business. Zbyszek, a rookie salesman and a womanizer, sometimes falls to scams, much to Bercik's amusement and delight.

In a large number of episodes, Alojz, the local barman often finds himself as the mediator of the duo, as they often visit szynk (the boozer; the pub) to discuss their next business ideas. Gerard and Kipuś are the two local unemployed alcoholics who both seem to have more common sense than Bercik. There is a running gag with Gerard who often comes to Bercik 'to borrow five zlotys for a pint'.

Various other characters appear throughout the series. Anna's successful brother Ernest has his businesses frequently ruined by Bercik whom Bercik has a great dislike towards, for being a 'gorol' (referring to Poles with no Silesian culture) and a 'hapol' (miser; penny-pincher). Johnny, the local postman, is afraid of Bercik whom he calles a 'silesian Psychopath', and Karlikowa, an old woman and Bercik's upstairs neighbour, who often pries and meddles.

Cast

References

External links 
 Święta wojna at IMDb

2000 Polish television series debuts
2009 Polish television series endings
Polish comedy television series
Telewizja Polska original programming
Polish television sitcoms